Elmwood Township is an inactive township in Saline County, in the U.S. state of Missouri.

Elmwood Township was erected in 1870, taking its name from the community of Elmwood, Missouri.

References

Townships in Missouri
Townships in Saline County, Missouri